Gioacchino Navarro (1748 – 1 January 1813) was a Maltese priest and poet who was the Conventual Chaplain of the Order of St. John. He studied both Latin and Greek, and he also spoke Italian, Maltese, English and Arabic. He was the librarian of the National Library of Malta for forty years, after succeeding Giovanni Pietro Francesco Agius de Soldanis in 1770.

Navarro is mainly known for his It-Tliet Għanjiet bil-Malti (The Three Rhymes in Maltese), which are the earliest known printed poems in the Maltese language. These were first published in 1791 in the book Malte par un Voyageur Français by François-Emmanuel Guignard, comte de Saint-Priest.

In Msida, Malta, there is a street named after this poet, called "Triq Gioacchino Navarro".

References

Further reading

1748 births
1813 deaths
18th-century Maltese Roman Catholic priests
19th-century Maltese poets
Maltese librarians
Maltese male poets
Italian-language writers from Malta
19th-century Maltese Roman Catholic priests